Sana (Sa-na) is a fermented milk drink originating from Romania. It is not certain when it was first created but it's been a staple of Romanian cuisine for centuries. 

Sana is similar to kefir, buttermilk or soured milk but unlike these, it is slightly sweeter in taste. It is made by fermenting the unpasteurised, raw milk by reducing its pH levels. Sana usually has at least 3.6% fat content. 

Sana is usually made from cow's milk but in recent years the goat milk sana has increased in popularity, mainly due to the better perceived health benefits of goat milk. There is also sheep's milk sana and even buffalo milk sana. 

Similar to other fermented dairy products, sana has health and gut benefits, contributing to a healthier gut microbiome. 

Sana is also used as an ingredient in various recipes for baking breads or other types of pastries.

It is only found in Romania and Moldova.

References 

Fermented dairy products
Fermented drinks
Milk-based drinks
Sour foods
Romanian drinks
Moldovan drinks